Stephen Clegg (born 23 November 1995) is a British Paralympic swimmer.

Career
He won bronze in the Men's 100 metre backstroke S12 and Men’s 100 metre freestyle in 2020, in which he broke the British record with a time of 53.43

Personal life
He is the brother of fellow para-swimmer James Clegg and para-athlete Libby Clegg.

References

External links
 

1995 births
Living people
British male freestyle swimmers
Paralympic swimmers of Great Britain
Paralympic bronze medalists for Great Britain
Paralympic silver medalists for Great Britain
Paralympic medalists in swimming
Swimmers at the 2020 Summer Paralympics
Medalists at the 2020 Summer Paralympics
Medalists at the World Para Swimming Championships
Place of birth missing (living people)
British male backstroke swimmers
British male butterfly swimmers
S12-classified Paralympic swimmers
Swimmers at the 2022 Commonwealth Games
Commonwealth Games medallists in swimming
Commonwealth Games silver medallists for England
21st-century British people
Medallists at the 2022 Commonwealth Games